Babson Park is a census-designated place (CDP) in Polk County, Florida, United States. The population was 1,182 at the 2000 census. It is also the home of Webber International University.

Babson Park is part of the Lakeland–Winter Haven Metropolitan Statistical Area, situated roughly halfway between Tampa and Orlando.

Geography

According to the United States Census Bureau, the CDP has a total area of 3.9 km2 (1.5 mi2), all land.

Demographics

As of the census of 2000, there were 1,182 people, 367 households, and 277 families residing in the CDP.  The population density was 306.3/km2 (791.4/mi2).  There were 442 housing units at an average density of 114.5/km2 (295.9/mi2).  The racial makeup of the CDP was 77.92% White, 16.92% African American, 1.44% Asian, 2.88% from other races, and 0.85% from two or more races. Hispanic or Latino of any race were 7.11% of the population.

There were 367 households, out of which 41.4% had children under the age of 18 living with them, 56.9% were married couples living together, 12.8% had a female householder with no husband present, and 24.3% were non-families. 17.4% of all households were made up of individuals, and 6.8% had someone living alone who was 65 years of age or older.  The average household size was 2.81 and the average family size was 3.22.

In the CDP, the population was spread out, with 26.7% under the age of 18, 18.4% from 18 to 24, 26.1% from 25 to 44, 18.0% from 45 to 64, and 10.8% who were 65 years of age or older.  The median age was 30 years. For every 100 females, there were 104.1 males.  For every 100 females age 18 and over, there were 100.9 males.

The median income for a household in the CDP was $28,487, and the median income for a family was $34,444. Males had a median income of $30,625 versus $18,875 for females. The per capita income for the CDP was $11,912.  About 9.2% of families and 10.3% of the population were below the poverty line, including 8.0% of those under age 18 and 15.9% of those age 65 or over.

Education
Despite its small size, Babson Park is home to Webber International University and just a half-mile from Warner University. Babson Park is also home to Dale R. Fair Babson Park Elementary.

Climate
The climate in this area is characterized by hot, humid summers and generally mild to cool winters.  According to the Köppen Climate Classification system, Babson Park has a humid subtropical climate, abbreviated "Cfa" on climate maps.

References

Census-designated places in Polk County, Florida
Census-designated places in Florida